The statue of former professional baseball catcher Johnny Bench by Paul Moore is installed outside Oklahoma City's Chickasaw Bricktown Ballpark, in the U.S. state of Oklahoma. The bronze sculpture was unveiled in 2001. The work is part of the City of Oklahoma City Public Art collection.

See also
 2001 in art

References

External links

 Johnny Bench – Bricktown Ballpark – OKC, OK at Waymarking

2001 establishments in Oklahoma
2001 sculptures
Baseball culture
Bricktown, Oklahoma City
Bronze sculptures in Oklahoma
Cultural depictions of American men
Cultural depictions of baseball players
Monuments and memorials in Oklahoma
Outdoor sculptures in Oklahoma City
Sculptures of men in Oklahoma
Statues in Oklahoma
Statues of sportspeople